Atik station is a station in Manitoba, Canada located between Barbe Lake and Kawia Lake along  Manitoba Highway 10.  The station is served by Via Rail's "The Pas-Pukatawagan" line for the Keewatin Railway twice per week in each direction.

References 

Via Rail stations in Manitoba